Diekirch (or (locally)  ; from Diet-Kirch, i.e. "people's church") is a commune with town status in north-eastern Luxembourg, capital city of the canton Diekirch and, until its abolition in 2015, the district of Diekirch. The town is situated on the banks of the Sauer river.

The town's heraldic shield, showing a crowned lion on a castle, was granted in 1988. It is based on the town's 14th-century seal and arms.

In 2001, the town of Diekirch itself, which lies in the south of the commune, had a population of 6,068.

in 1977, Diekirch was the first town in Luxembourg to have a pedestrian zone.

Diekirch is home to a brewery of national importance carrying the town's name.

Three secondary schools are located in Diekirch: Lycée classique de Diekirch, Lycée technique hôtelier Alexis Heck and Nordstadlycée.

The town is home to the national operational headquarters of the Luxembourgish Army at the Haerebierg Military Centre (located on the hill Herrenberg) and the National Museum of Military History, reflecting Diekirch's pivotal role in the famous Battle of the Bulge, called by the Germans Rundstedt-Offensive, a major battle of World War II. It was here that the river Sauer was crossed on the night of January 18, 1945, by the US 5th Infantry division.

The town is also the seat of one of the six regional headquarters of the Grand Ducal Police and one of Luxembourg's two judicial districts.

As far as sports events are concerned, Diekirch has gained a reputation for its annual cross country running competition — the Eurocross — which is an IAAF permit meeting and attracts world-class runners, with Gabriela Szabo and Irina Mikitenko among its past winners.

History
The town received its name, according to old sources, when Charlemagne in the late 8th century resettled Saxons, in order to bring them under his control. One of the centre of these settlements was in the area of Diekirch. In order to convert the pagan Saxons to Christianity, a church was built, which gave the settlement its name: "Diet-Kirch" ("people's church"). In Old Franconian, thiuda (Old High German: "diot" - the people). Þeudō is a reconstructed word from Germanic, which plays a role in the etymology of the term "Deutsch".

In the 14th century, John, the blind king of Bohemia, fortified it, surrounding the place with a castellated wall and a ditch supplied by a stream. It remained more or less fortified until the beginning of the 19th century when the French, during their occupation, levelled the old walls and substituted avenues of trees.

In the course of extensive excavation in the 1960s, it was shown that the St. Laurence church is a Roman building. In the early 20th century, wall ruins and mosaics were found north of the town center. Archaeological investigations in 1992–1993, 1999, and 2008 enabled the reconstruction of a large Roman villa, which extended over all the land of the medieval town and was abandoned in the early 5th century.

Mascot
The town's mascot is the donkey. There is a donkey fountain in the centre of Diekirch. The yearly cavalcade (carnival procession) is held under the sign of the donkey.

Population

Notable people 

 Paul Eyschen (1841–1915) a Luxembourgish politician, statesman, lawyer, and diplomat. He was the eighth Prime Minister of Luxembourg, serving for twenty-seven years, 1888–1915.
 Léon Roth (born 1926) a Luxembourgian sprint canoer who competed in the 1952 Summer Olympics
 Johnny Lucas (1931–1993) a Luxembourgian sprint canoer who competed in the 1952 Summer Olympics
 Ali Kaes (born 1955) a Luxembourgish politician
 Alfred Albert Joe de Re la Gardiur (1881–1941), a Professional wrestler.
 General Gaston Reinig (born 1956) a Luxembourgian soldier and a former Chief of Defence of the Luxembourg Army
 Michael Pinto (born 1993) a Portuguese professional footballer

Twin towns — sister cities

Diekirch is twinned with:

 Arlon, Belgium
 Bitburg, Germany since 1962
 Hayange, France
 Liberty, United States
 Monthey, Switzerland

Gallery

References

External links

 

 
Cities in Luxembourg
Communes in Diekirch (canton)
Towns in Luxembourg